The Gates of Oblivion is the third full-length album of the Spanish power metal band Dark Moor, released March 31, 2002 on Arise Records. It's also the last album with singer Elisa C. Martín.

This album had the collaboration of the Valcavasian Choir and the singer Dan Keying of Cydonia. It was produced by Luigi Stefanini.

Track listing

Band
 Elisa Martin - lead & backing vocals, soprano voice on #12
 Enrik Garcia - guitars & backing vocals
 Albert Maroto - guitars & backing vocals
 Anan Kaddouri - bass
 Jorge Sáez - drums
 Roberto Peña de Camús - keyboards

Guest musicians
 Valcavasia's choir - choir on #01, 02, 04, 08 & 12
 Dan Keying - guest vocals on #04, 05, 07, 08 & 11

Production
 Luigi Stefanini - producer
 Andreas Marschall - artwork

Concept
 "A New World" is about the discovering of America.
 "Nevermore" is about Edgar Allan Poe and his novels.
 "Starsmaker (Elbereth)" is about Varda, a Valië (Goddess) in J. R. R. Tolkien's legendarium.
 "Dies Irae (Amadeus)" is a tribute to Amadeus Mozart.

References

2002 albums
Dark Moor albums